Don Elias Mansur Ballpark is a multi-use stadium in Oranjestad, Aruba.  It is currently used mostly for baseball games.  The stadium has a capacity of 12,000 people.

References

Sports venues in Aruba
Buildings and structures in Oranjestad, Aruba